Hashtijan (also Romanized as Hashtījān and Hashteyjān) is a village in Rahmat Rural District, Seyyedan District, Marvdasht County, Fars Province, Iran. At the 2006 census, its population was 467, in 113 families.

References 

Populated places in Marvdasht County